Sinna Sherina Munaf or better known as Sherina Munaf (born in Bandung, West Java, Indonesia on June 11, 1990) is an Indonesian actress, singer and songwriter of Minangkabau descent. She is the niece of Indonesian singer-songwriter, Fariz RM.

Life and career 
Sinna Sherina Munaf was born on 11 June 1990, the second child of Triawan Munaf and Luki Ariani. As a child, she enjoyed painting and singing. Her parents arranged for her to have singing lessons from Elfa Secioria. In 1997, she won a karaoke contest in Jakarta, followed by victory in a second singing contest in 1998.

1990–2001: The beginnings and Petualangan Sherina
In 1999, at the age of nine, Sherina made her debut album Andai Aku Besar Nanti (When I Grow Up) under Tantowi Yahya's label Ceepee Productions. The album went Platinum, selling over 250,000 copies and won two Indonesian Music Awards for Best Child Song and Best Children's Album.

In 2000, Sherina's father, Triawan Munaf, collaborated with Mira Lesmana to produce the movie Petualangan Sherina (Sherina's Adventure), which directed by Riri Riza and gained wide theatrical release in Indonesia. The soundtrack of Sherina's Adventure also gave the youngster another hit album. According to Ceepee Productions record company, it went Platinum by the end of August, with sales of more than 200,000 copies and revenues of $387,000.

The album Petualangan Sherina won Indonesian Music Awards for Best Child Song and Best Children's Album plus Best Child Singer. Sherina also won Most Favorite Child Artist from Bobo  twice in a row (1999 and 2000). In 2000, Asia Pacific Film Festival gave her a Special Jury Award as the Talented Child Actress. Despite her talents on the big screen, Sherina preferred to be known as 'just a singer'.

An article in Asiaweek magazine described her as Asian News Maker of the year 2000. She was interviewed by BBC London, which gained the attention of Westlife, who would duet with her on "I Have a Dream" for the Asian market. Gumilang Ramadhan (general manager of Sony BMG Indonesia) said, "part of the profit from the sales will be given to Indonesian children through an international charity foundation".

In 2001, Sherina was interviewed by Hong Kong TV network Star TV on its "Focus Asia" program, in which she was named a Princess of Pop by Adrian Brown. She appeared in numerous TV commercials and was sent by the WWF (World Wide Fund for Nature) to Japan for an orangutan awareness campaign: Borneo Orangutan Survival. Sherina was nominated as the Most Preferred Kid Actress and TV Talent based on National Kid Market Survey by Frontier Marketing and Research Consultant. Also on the same year, she recorded a cover of "I Have A Dream" with Irish boyband Westlife to raise funds for UNICEF and received a special award in the "Most Talented Child Artist" category in the 2001 Asia Pacific Film Festival in Hanoi for her performance. At the end of 2001, Sherina was named the Most Shining Star Child by RCTI.

In June 2001, Sherina sang "Simfoni Raya", written by Guruh Sukarnoputra for his album Bakti dan Persembahanku, released to celebrate the centenary anniversary of the birth of Indonesia's founding president Sukarno.

2002–2004: My Life 
In 2002, Sherina released her third album, titled "My Life". This album showed Sherina shifting from childhood songs toward teenage themes. The album's singles are "My Life", "Click Clock", and "Aku Beranjak Dewasa". It also features a song written by Sherina,  "Kisah Sang Lebah" (Bee Story).

2007-2014: Primadona, Gemini, and Tuna 
To shed her child star image, Sherina signed to Trinity Optima Productions and released her fourth album, Primadona, on 14 March 2007, spewing out two singles: Sendiri and Ku Disini. 7 of the tracks of her fourth album was written solely by Sherina herself. Slank veteran Abdee Negara was recruited to play guitar chords for Sendiri. Before she released her fifth album, Gemini, on 9 July 2009, she created two soundtrack singles in 2008: Jalan Cinta for Ayat-Ayat Cinta and KuBahagia for Laskar Pelangi. Both soundtracks appeared on Gemini, which spewed three singles: Cinta Pertama dan Terakhir, Geregetan (technically a cover of her father's song from his band days) and Pergilah Kau. Around 2007–2010, she became brand ambassadors for Panasonic, Casio, and Maybelline New York.

Sherina was an Ambassador at the World Youth Conference, One Young World, in Zurich, Switzerland, in September 2011. She performed the Sing Your Mind, written specially for the event. In February 2013, she became a judge and coach on the Indonesian version of The Voice, and released her first mini album entitled Tuna. It spawned three singles: Sebelum Selamanya, Akan KuTunggu, and Apakah Ku Jatuh Cinta (a collaboration with labelmate Vidi Aldiano). After the album's release, she went to Australia for studying Science at University of Sydney, and Japan for studying Japanese language and animation.

2018-2021: Wiro Sableng, Earwig and the Witch and Petualangan Sherina 2 
In 2017, Sherina was cast as Anggini, a female warrior trained under guidance of Dewa Tuak for Fox International Productions and Lifelike Pictures collaboration Wiro Sableng (212 Warrior). The film was released on 30 August 2018 to critical acclaim. In 2019, she was cast as Earwig's mother in Studio Ghibli's Earwig and the Witch as well as composing the theme song Don't Disturb Me alongside Hiroki Kamemoto of Glim Spanky, Kiyokazu Takano of Mrs. Green Apple, and Kavka Shishido. The movie was released as a television film on NHK on 30 December 2020, followed by planned theatrical release in 2021.

On 3 November 2020, she married Indonesian actor and male model, Baskara Mahendra. In 2021, Sherina and the other cast and producers of Petualangan Sherina (Sherina's Adventure) announced the sequel of the 2000 cult film, with Sherina confirmed to fill in the role of music producer alongside her elder sister Virania, filling Elfa Secioria's seat as Elfa passed away in 2011.

Artistry

Acting stardom
Before achieving success as a child singer, Sherina's nascent acting skills had attracted the attention of the Miles Production film company, which thought she would fit nicely into a musical they were planning, called Vera and Elmo's Adventure, to be directed by Riri Riza. Producer Mira Lesmana recalled: "We set out to make a film for Indonesian families. They don't want serious, heavy stuff. The important thing was to produce something that was entertaining and would make families feel good about the Indonesian cinema again." Shooting began in November 1999, with Sherina as the young lead.

As the storyline was being finalized, Andai Aku Besar Nanti was released, catapulting Sherina to an established name. She was now bigger than the movie, which was re-titled Sherina's Adventure. It tells the story of a musically gifted girl, very much like Sherina, who moves with her family from Jakarta to Bandung. When a classmate is kidnapped in a business dispute, the diminutive heroine sets out to free him. The simplicity of the story and its old-fashioned family entertainment made it a popular film during the period of Indonesia's transition from an authoritarian regime to democracy.

Released in June 2000, Sherina's Adventure sold 1.4 million tickets in six months and earned an estimated $723,000 from a budget of $241,000.

Discography 
Studio Album
 Andai Aku Besar Nanti (1999)
 Petualangan Sherina (2000)
 My Life (2002)
 Primadona (2007)
 Gemini (2009)
 Tuna (2013)

Mini Album
  I Have a Dream (2001)

Best Sherina Compilation Album
 Sherina & Sherina – Karaoke Version (2001)
 Sherina – Karaoke Version – ASEAN distribute (2002) 
 The Best of Sherina (2003)
 My 3 Little Album (2013)
 Symphony of Love (2013)

Compilation Album
 Indonesia Female Singers Compilation – Swara Cantik (2001)
 100 Tahun Bung Karno: Penyambung Lidah Rakyat -Simfoni Raya Indonesia (2001) 
 Indonesian Campaign Single – My Indonesia (2002)
 BMG Nu. 1 (BMG artist compilation: Britney Spears, Nelly Furtado, Alicia Keys, Coco Lee, Westlife, Hans Zimmer, Nelly Furtado and Sherina) – Pelangiku & Lihatlah Lebih Dekat (2002) 
 Indonesia Menangis Tsunami Aceh 2004 – Indonesia Menangis (2005)
 OST. Ayat-ayat Cinta – Jalan Cinta (2007)
 OST. Laskar Pelangi – Ku Bahagia (2008)
 Indonesia Unite – Rindu Bersatu with ST12, Nidji, d'Masiv, Vierra, Gita Gutawa, The Changcuters, Kotak, Kangen Band, Rio Febrian, Geisha, Azhura, and Ungu (2010)
 Beta Cinta Indonesia – Simfoni Raya Indonesia (2011)Other Single Selamat Datang Cinta with Elfa Secioria (2009)
 Krisis Air with Slank, Nugie, Nadine Chandrawinata (2010)
 Satu Hati – Satu Hati Campaign (2010) 
 Sing Your Mind – One Young World in Zurich, Switzerland performance (2011)
 Ayo! Indonesia Bisa with Ello – Official 26th Sea Games in Indonesia (2011)

 Music Video 

 Back-up Vocal 
 Emily – "Salah Tingkah" (2012)

 Filmography 

 Judge Performance 
Sherina signed to be a judge on The Voice, which debuted on Indosiar in February 2013. Sherina serves as a coach, alongside fellow musicians Armand Maulana, Giring Ganesha and Glenn Fredly, with Darius Sinathriya and Fenita Arie'' as the show's host.

Host
 Kuis Sherina – Sherina Quiz (RCTI, 1999)
 Main Bersama Sherina – Playing with Sherina (RCTI, 1999)
 Jiffest (RCTI, 2001)
 Narator Surat Sahabat – Friends Letter (Narrator) (SCTV, 2006)

Icon and Brand Ambassador
 Tini Wini Biti (1999–2002) 
 Pediasure (2000–2001) 
 Curcuma Plus (2000–2002)
 Susu Bendera (2000–2001)
 WWF (Worldwide Fund) (2001)
 Indonesia Tourism Campaigns (2002)
 My Noodle (2003) 
 UNICEF (2004)
 Panasonic Gobel Indonesia (2007)
 Grand Indonesia (2009)
 Duta Lingkungan Hidup – Indonesian Natural Environment Icon (2009)
 Maybelline New York (2010)
 Simpati Freedom – Telkomsel (2010)
 MTV Staying Alive (2010)
 Clear (shampoo) (2011)
 Satu Hati Cerdaskan Bangsa (SHCB) Pocari Sweat (2011)
 One Young World (2011)
 Natur-E (2012)
 Kaspersky Anti-Virus (2012)
 Uniqlo (2013)
 KakaoTalk (2013)

Awards and nominations

References

External links 

1990 births
English-language singers from Indonesia
Minangkabau people
Sundanese people
Indonesian people of Yemeni descent
Living people
Indonesian child singers
21st-century Indonesian women singers
Indonesian pop singers
Anugerah Musik Indonesia winners
People from Bandung
Actresses from West Java
Musicians from West Java
Indonesian child actresses